Balcarzowice (is a village in the administrative district of Gmina Ujazd, within Strzelce County, Opole Voivodeship, in south-western Poland.

The village has an approximate population of 250.

References

Villages in Strzelce County